Gornye Klyuchi (lit. mountain springs) is an urban locality (a resort settlement) in Kirovsky District of Primorsky Krai, Russia, located on the Ussuri River near the mouth of the Draguchina River,  from the district's administrative center of Kirovsky. Population:

History
It was founded in 1935 and was granted resort settlement status in 1965.

Tourism
Shmakovka resort and Saint-Trinity Nicholas monastery, the oldest male monastery in the Russian Far East, are located near Gornye Klyuchi.

References

Urban-type settlements in Primorsky Krai